The British Isles Bowls Championships is a tournament held between the champions of their respective nations, England Scotland, Wales, combined Ireland and more recently Guernsey and Jersey. It was first held in 1960 although the triples event did not start until 1977.

The women's events started in June 1972, with the triples starting in 1982. The first women's singles winner was Lilian Nicholas of Wales. The first men's singles winner was Kenneth Coulson of England and the legendary David Bryant MBE holds the record for the most singles titles with four.

The tournament is held the year after each of the National champions have been crowned. The 2020 edition was initially cancelled due to the COVID-19 pandemic but because there were no National Championships held during 2020 (also due to the pandemic) the 2020 edition was rescheduled for 2021.

Men's Singles Champions

Men's Pairs Champions

Men's Triples Champions

Men's Fours Champions

+ selected to represent the nation but was not their National champion at the time.

Women's Singles Champions

Women's Pairs Champions

Women's Triples Champions

Women's Fours Champions

References

Bowls competitions